The 2007–08 Football League Trophy, known as the 2007–08 Johnstone's Paint Trophy for sponsorship reasons, was the 24th staging of the Football League Trophy, a knockout competition for English football clubs in Leagues One and Two.  The winners were MK Dons and the runners-up were Grimsby Town, both from League Two.

The competition began on 18 September 2007 and ended with the final on 30 March 2008. The final took place at Wembley Stadium for the first time since 2000.

In the first round, there are four sections: North West, North East, South West and South East. In the second round this narrows to simply a Northern and a Southern section, whereupon each section gradually eliminates teams in knock-out fashion until each has a winning finalist. At this point, the two winning finalists face each other in the combined final for the honour of the trophy.

Doncaster Rovers were the defending champions, but lost to Grimsby on penalties in the Third round.

MK Dons won the final, beating Grimsby Town 2–0.

First round 
16 teams received byes to the second round from each section. The other remaining teams start in a single-legged knockout. Should the scores be level after 90 minutes, the match entered a penalty shootout phase, with no extra-time being played.

Northern Section

Southern Section

Second round
In the second round, the sixteen winning teams from the first round were joined by the teams with byes. Again, there were eight one-legged matches in each section (North and South), with a penalty shootout if a draw occurred after 90 minutes.

The teams that received byes in the Northern section were Bury, Carlisle United, Darlington, Leeds United, Lincoln City, Port Vale, Rochdale and Stockport County, while Barnet, Brighton & Hove Albion, Bristol Rovers, Cheltenham Town, Gillingham, Hereford United, Milton Keynes Dons and Wycombe Wanderers received byes in the Southern section.

Northern Section

Southern Section

Area quarter-finals
In the third round, the winning teams from the second round play in eight one-legged matches, four in each section (North and South). Again, a penalty shootout followed if the match was drawn after 90 minutes. Matches were played on 13 November and 14 November 2007.

Northern Section

Southern Section

Area semi-finals
Matches were played on 8 January 2008.

Northern Section

Southern Section

Area finals

Northern Area final

Southern Area final

Final

External links
Official website

EFL Trophy
Trophy
Trophy